The Cincinnati, Georgetown and Portsmouth Railroad (CG&P RR) was an interurban railway serving communities in southwestern Ohio. Originally called the Cincinnati and Portsmouth, it was initially organized by Henry Brachmann in 1873.

References 

Defunct Ohio railroads
Railway companies established in 1873